K-141 Kursk (transl. , meaning "Atomic-powered submarine Kursk") was an Oscar II-class nuclear-powered cruise missile submarine of the Russian Navy. On 12 August 2000, K-141 Kursk was lost when it sank in the Barents Sea, killing all 118 personnel on board.

Construction 

K-141 Kursk was a Project 949A class Antey submarine of the Oscar class, known as the Oscar II by its NATO reporting name, and was the penultimate submarine of the Oscar II class designed and approved in the Soviet Union. Construction began in 1990 at the Soviet Navy military shipyards in Severodvinsk, near Arkhangelsk, in the northern Russian SFSR. During the construction of K-141, the Soviet Union collapsed; work continued, and she became one of the first naval vessels completed after the collapse. In 1993 K-141 was named Kursk after the Battle of Kursk in the 50-year anniversary of this battle. K-141 was inherited by Russia and launched in 1994, before being commissioned by the Russian Navy on December 30, as part of the Russian Northern Fleet.

Kursk was assigned to the home port of Vidyayevo, Murmansk Oblast.

Capabilities 

The Antey design represented the highest achievement of Soviet nuclear submarine technology. They are the second-largest cruise missile submarines ever built, after some  ballistic missile submarines were converted to carry cruise missiles in 2007. It was built to defeat an entire United States aircraft carrier group. A single Type 65 torpedo carried a  warhead powerful enough to sink an aircraft carrier. Both missiles and torpedoes could be equipped with nuclear warheads. She was  longer than the preceding Oscar I-class of submarines. The senior officers had individual staterooms and the entire crew had access to a gymnasium.

There was a  gap to the -thick steel pressure hull. She was designed to remain submerged for up to 120 days. The sail superstructure was reinforced to allow it to break through the Arctic ice.
The submarine was armed with  24 SS-N-19/P-700 Granit cruise missiles, and eight torpedo tubes in the bow: four  and four . They were designed to swarm enemy vessels and intelligently choose individual targets which terminated with a dive onto the target. Her weapons included 18 SS-N-16 "Stallion" anti-submarine missiles.

Kursk was part of Russia's Northern Fleet, which had suffered funding cutbacks throughout the 1990s. Many of its submarines were anchored and rusting in Zapadnaya Litsa Naval Base,  from Murmansk. Little work to maintain all but the most essential front-line equipment, including search and rescue equipment, had occurred. Northern Fleet sailors had gone unpaid in the mid-1990s.

Deployments 

During her five years of service, Kursk completed only one mission, a six-month deployment to the Mediterranean Sea during the summer of 1999 to monitor the United States Sixth Fleet responding to the Kosovo crisis. This was due to a lack of funds for fuel. As a result, many of her crew had spent little time at sea and were inexperienced.

Naval exercise and disaster 

Kursk joined the "Summer-X" exercise, the first large-scale naval exercise planned by the Russian Navy in more than a decade, on 10 August 2000. It included 30 ships including the fleet's flagship Pyotr Velikiy, four attack submarines, and a flotilla of smaller ships. The crew had recently won a citation for its excellent performance and had been recognized as the best submarine crew in the Northern Fleet. While it was on an exercise, Kursk loaded a full complement of combat weapons. It was one of the few vessels authorized to carry a combat load at all times.

Explosion 

On the first day of the exercise, Kursk successfully launched a Granit missile armed with a dummy warhead. Two days later, on the morning of 12 August, Kursk prepared to fire dummy torpedoes at the  Pyotr Velikiy. These practice torpedoes had no explosive warheads and were manufactured and tested at a much lower quality standard. On 12 August 2000, at 11:28 local time (07:28 UTC), there was an explosion while preparing to fire. The Russian Navy's final report on the disaster concluded the explosion was due to the failure of one of Kursk hydrogen peroxide-fueled Type 65 torpedoes. A subsequent investigation concluded that high-test peroxide (HTP), a form of highly concentrated hydrogen peroxide used as propellant for the torpedo, seeped through a faulty weld in the torpedo casing. When HTP comes into contact with a catalyst, it rapidly expands by a factor of 5000, generating vast quantities of steam and oxygen. A second explosion 135 seconds after the initial event was equivalent to 3-7 tons of TNT. The explosions blew a large hole in the hull and caused the first three compartments of the submarine to collapse, killing or incapacitating all but 23 of the 118 personnel on board.

Rescue attempts 
The British and Norwegian navies offered assistance, but Russia initially refused all help. All 118 sailors and officers aboard Kursk died. The Russian Admiralty initially told the public that the majority of the crew died within minutes of the explosion, but on 21 August, Norwegian and Russian divers found 24 bodies in the ninth compartment, the turbine room at the stern of the boat. Captain-lieutenant Dmitri Kolesnikov wrote a note listing the names of 23 sailors who were alive in the compartment after the boat sank.

Kursk carried a potassium superoxide cartridge of a chemical oxygen generator; these are used to absorb carbon dioxide and chemically release oxygen during an emergency. However, the cartridge became contaminated with sea water and the resulting chemical reaction caused a flash fire which consumed the available oxygen. The investigation showed that some men temporarily survived the fire by plunging under water, as fire marks on the bulkheads indicated the water was at waist level at the time. Ultimately, the remaining crew burned to death or suffocated.

Russian President Vladimir Putin, though immediately informed of the tragedy, was told by the navy that they had the situation under control and that rescue was imminent. He waited for five days before ending his holiday at a presidential resort in Sochi on the Black Sea. Putin was only four months into his tenure as president, and the public and media were extremely critical of his decision to remain at a seaside resort. His highly favourable ratings dropped dramatically.  The president's response appeared callous and the government's actions looked incompetent. A year later he said, "I probably should have returned to Moscow, but nothing would have changed. I had the same level of communication both in Sochi and in Moscow, but from a PR point of view I could have demonstrated some special eagerness to return."

Submarine recovery

A consortium formed by the Dutch companies Mammoet and Smit International was awarded a contract by Russia to raise the vessel, excluding the bow. They modified the barge Giant 4 which raised Kursk and recovered the remains of the sailors.

During salvage operations in 2001, the team first cut the bow off the hull using a tungsten carbide-studded cable. As this tool had the potential to cause sparks which could ignite remaining pockets of reactive gases, such as hydrogen, the operation was executed with care. Most of the bow was abandoned and the rest of the vessel was towed to Severomorsk and placed in a floating dry dock for analysis.

The remains of Kursks reactor compartment were towed to Sayda Bay on Russia's northern Kola Peninsula, where more than 50 reactor compartments were afloat at pier points, after a shipyard had removed all the fuel from the boat in early 2003.

Some torpedo and torpedo tube fragments from the bow were recovered and the rest was destroyed by explosives in 2002.

Official inquiry results
Notwithstanding the navy's oft-stated position that a collision with a foreign vessel had triggered the event, a report issued by the government attributed the disaster to a torpedo explosion caused when high-test peroxide (HTP), a form of highly concentrated hydrogen peroxide, leaked from a faulty weld in the torpedo's casing. The report found that the initial explosion destroyed the torpedo room compartment and killed everyone in the first compartment. The blast entered the second and perhaps the third and fourth compartments through an air conditioning vent. All of the 36 men in the command post located in the second compartment were immediately incapacitated by the blast wave and possibly killed. The heat caused the warheads of between five and seven additional torpedoes to detonate, creating an explosion equivalent to 2–3 tons of TNT that measured 4.2 on the Richter magnitude scale on seismographs across Europe and was detected as far away as Alaska.

Alternative explanation 
Vice-Admiral Valery Ryazantsev differed with the government's official conclusion. He cited inadequate training, poor maintenance, and incomplete inspections that caused the crew to mishandle the weapon.  During the examination of the wrecked sub, investigators recovered a partially burned copy of the safety instructions for loading HTP torpedoes, but the instructions were for a significantly different type of torpedo and failed to include essential steps for testing an air valve. The 7th Division, 1st Submarine Flotilla never inspected Kursks crew's qualifications and readiness to fire HTP torpedoes. Kursks crew had no experience with HTP-powered torpedoes and had not been trained in handling or firing HTP-powered torpedoes. Due to their inexperience and lack of training, compounded by incomplete inspections and oversight, and because the  Kursks crew followed faulty instructions when loading the practice torpedo, Ryazantsev believes they set off a chain of events that led to the explosion.

Media

Books 
 Truscott, Peter (2002), Kursk: Russia's  Lost Pride. Simon & Schuster UK. 
 Dunmore, Spencer (2002), Lost Subs: From the "Hunley" to the "Kursk", the Greatest Submarines Ever Lost – And Found. Cambridge, MA: Da Capo. 
 Moore, Robert (2002), A Time to Die: The Untold Story of the Kursk Tragedy. Crown Publishers NY, NY. 
 Weir, Gary E. and Boyne, Walter J. (2003), Rising Tide: The Untold Story Of The Russian Submarines That Fought The Cold War. Basic Books, NY, NY. 
 Flynn, Ramsey (2004), Cry from the Deep: The Sinking of the Kursk, the Submarine Disaster That Riveted the World and Put the New Russia to the Ultimate Test. Harper Collins. 
 Rear Admiral Mian Zahir Shah (2005) Sea Phoenix: A True Submarine Story.

Songs 
"Travel Is Dangerous", a song from the album Mr Beast by post-rock band Mogwai.
Finnish doom metal band Kypck is claimed to have cross-references both to the Battle Of Kursk and the submarine named after the city.
"Капитан Колесников" (Captain Kolesnikov) song by a Russian rock band DDT
"Icy blackness (Kursk)", a heavy metal song by Armageddon Rev. 16:16 from the album "Sundown on Humanity"
"The Kursk" is a song by Matt Elliott (musician) from his album "Drinking Songs"
 Sequoya's "Barren the Sea", a folk song about the tragedy
"Angel 141 (Russian: Ангел 141)" is a song by [AMATORY] from the album "DOOM" (2019)
"K-141 Kursk" is a song by heavy metal band Wolf from their album Legions of Bastards

Theatre 
 The Kursk – play about the trapped survivors, By Sasha Janowicz.
 Kursk – a play by playwright Bryony Lavery from the British point of view.

Movies 
 Kursk (also known as "The Command", and "Kursk: The Last Mission"). - The film from 2018 follows the 2000 K-141 Kursk submarine disaster and the governmental negligence that followed. By Thomas Vinterberg.

Art 

 Kursk, a 2004 art work by Finnish sculptor Markus Copper. The work consists of eight live size diver figures hanging from a steel frame and slowly knocking a steel wall with monkey wrenches. The action is launched by a glowing electronic unit.

See also 
 2008 Russian submarine accident
 List of Russian military accidents
 List of sunken nuclear submarines
 Major submarine incidents since 2000
 Submarines destroyed by hot-running torpedoes: , and possibly  and 
 Igor Spasskiy – The designer of the Oscar II class

References

External links 
 Project 949 Granit / Oscar I Project 949A Antey / Oscar II
 BBC: Kursk mistakes haunt Russia
 
 Kursk on the wrecksite, chart and position
 Kursk memorial website
 Risks and hazards during the recovery of the Kursk
 A detailed timeline of the recovery operations
 Raising the Kursk, 31-minute technical documentary video

 
Lost submarines of Russia
Maritime incidents in 2000
Oscar-class submarines
Ships built in Russia
Ships of the Russian Northern Fleet
Shipwrecks in the Barents Sea
Submarine accidents caused by torpedoes
Sunken nuclear submarines
1994 ships
Ships sunk by non-combat internal explosions
Warships lost with all hands
Nuclear submarines of the Russian Navy